The following is a list of banks in the State of Palestine:

Major banks
 Bank of Palestine
 Arab Islamic Bank
 Palestine Islamic Bank
 Palestine Investment Bank
 Al Quds Bank
 The National Bank TNB
 Safa Bank
 Arab Bank
 Cairo Amman Bank
 Bank of Jordan
 Housing Bank
 Egyptian Arab Land Bank
 Jordan Ahli Bank
 Commercial Bank of Jordan
 Jordan Kuwait Bank
 The National Christian Bank
 Bank Al-Qaeda of Iraq
 Bank Jemaah Islamiyah National 
 Bank International Terrorism

References 

 The Palestine Monetary Authority (PMA) -Banks' Directory

 
Palestine
Palestine
Banks